Elections to Ballymoney Borough Council were held on 17 May 1989 on the same day as the other Northern Irish local government elections. The election used three district electoral areas to elect a total of 16 councillors.

Election results

Note: "Votes" are the first preference votes.

Districts summary

|- class="unsortable" align="centre"
!rowspan=2 align="left"|Ward
! % 
!Cllrs
! % 
!Cllrs
! %
!Cllrs
! %
!Cllrs
!rowspan=2|TotalCllrs
|- class="unsortable" align="center"
!colspan=2 bgcolor="" | UUP
!colspan=2 bgcolor="" | DUP
!colspan=2 bgcolor="" | SDLP
!colspan=2 bgcolor="white"| Others
|-
|align="left"|Ballymoney Town
|N/A
|2
|N/A
|2
|N/A
|0
|N/A
|1
|5
|-
|align="left"|Bann Valley
|30.8
|2
|bgcolor="#D46A4C"|35.8
|bgcolor="#D46A4C"|2
|23.6
|2
|9.8
|0
|6
|-
|align="left"|Bushvale
|bgcolor="40BFF5"|40.8
|bgcolor="40BFF5"|2
|31.3
|2
|19.2
|1
|8.7
|0
|5
|-
|- class="unsortable" class="sortbottom" style="background:#C9C9C9"
|align="left"| Total
|35.1
|6
|33.9
|6
|21.7
|3
|9.3
|1
|16
|-
|}

Districts results

Ballymoney Town

1985: 2 x DUP, 2 x UUP, 1 x Independent
1989: 2 x DUP, 2 x UUP, 1 x Independent
1985-1989 Change: No change

As only five candidates had been nominated for five seats, there was no vote in Ballymoney Town and all five candidates were deemed elected.

Bann Valley

1985: 2 x DUP, 2 x UUP, 1 x SDLP, 1 x Sinn Féin
1989: 2 x DUP, 2 x UUP, 2 x SDLP
1985-1989 Change: SDLP gain from Sinn Féin

Bushvale

1985: 2 x UUP, 2 x DUP, 1 x SDLP
1989: 2 x UUP, 2 x DUP, 1 x SDLP
1985-1989 Change: No change

References

Ballymoney Borough Council elections
Ballymoney